The 31st America's Cup was contested between the holder, Team New Zealand, and the winner of the 2003 Louis Vuitton Cup, Alinghi.

Build Up

The 2002–2003 Louis Vuitton Cup, held in the Hauraki Gulf in Auckland, New Zealand saw nine teams from six countries staging 120 races over five months to select a challenger for the America's Cup. Due to sponsorship rules in force at the time, the boats were not allowed to be named after their sponsors which affected only one challenger. The Oracle boat was referenced by its sail number USA-76 because the team did not give the boat a name.

On January 19, 2003 the Swiss challenger Ernesto Bertarelli’s Alinghi, skippered by Russell Coutts, won the Louis Vuitton Cup Finals by defeating the American challenger, Larry Ellison's Oracle, 5–1, once again eliminating the United States from the America's Cup competition.

The America's Cup Races

Racing for the America's Cup began On February 15, 2003. In a stiff breeze, Alinghi won the first race easily after New Zealand, skippered throughout the series by Dean Barker, withdrew due to multiple gear failures in the rigging and the low cockpit unexpectedly taking onboard large quantities of water.

Race 2, on February 16, 2003, was won by Alinghi by a margin of only seven seconds. It was one of the closest, most exciting races seen for years, with the lead changing several times and a duel of 33 tacking manoeuvres on the fifth leg.

Then on February 18, in Race 3, Alinghi won the critical start, after receiving last minute advice about a wind shift, and led throughout the race, winning with a 23-second margin.

After nine days without being able to race, first due to a lack of wind, then with high winds and rough seas making it too dangerous to race, February 28, originally a planned lay-day, was chosen as a race day. Race 4 was again sailed in strong winds and rough seas and New Zealand's difficulties continued, when her mast snapped on the third leg.

The next day, March 1, 2003, was again a frustratingly calm day, the race finally being called off after the yachts had again spent over two hours waiting for a start in the light air. Alinghi skipper Russell Coutts was unable to celebrate his 41st birthday with a cup win, but was in a commanding position in the series to do so on March 2. Race 5 started on time in a good breeze. Alinghi again won the start and kept ahead. On the forth leg, New Zealand broke a spinnaker pole during a manoeuvre. Although it was put overboard and replaced with a spare pole, New Zealand was unable to recover, conceding Alinghi's sweep to the title.

The win by Alinghi meant Coutts, who had previously sailed for New Zealand, had won every one of the last 14 America's Cup races he had competed in as skipper, the most by any America's Cup skipper. This meant he had won an America's Cup regatta twice as challenger, as well as having been a successful defender.

Race Summary

Crew

Team New Zealand

Cameron Appleton was the backup helmsman with Rod Davis, Dan Slater and Clay Oliver in the reserve afterguard.

Alinghi

References

ultimatesail.com

 
America's Cup regattas
Americas Cup
Americas Cup
Sport in Auckland
Sailing competitions in New Zealand
Auckland waterfront
Waitematā Harbour